This is a list of notable painters from, or associated with, Slovakia.

A
Janko Alexy (1894-1970)
Jaroslav Augusta (1878-1970)
Sarah Avni

B
Zuzana Rabina Bachorikova (born 1961)
Blažej Baláž (born 1958)
Mária Balážová (born 1956)
Miloš Alexander Bazovský (1899-1968)
Martin Benka (1888-1971)
Peter Michal Bohúň (1822-1879)
Albín Brunovský (1935-1997)

F
Rudolf Fila (1932-2015)
Ľudovít Fulla (1902-1980)

G
Mikuláš Galanda (1895-1938)

J
Július Jakoby (1903-1985)

K
Jozef Božetech Klemens (1817-1883)

L
Ľudovít Lehen (1925-2014)
Anton Lehmden (1929-2018)

M
Palo Macho (born 1965)
Oldrich Majda (1930-2006)
Cyprián Majerník (1909-1945)

P
Ivan Pavle (born 1955)
Julius Podlipny (1898-1991)

P
Vladimír Popovič (born 1939)

S
Koloman Sokol (1902-2003)
Karl Sovanka (1883-1961)
Tibor Spitz (born 1929)
Adam Szentpétery (born 1956)

V
Marko Vrzgula (born 1966)

Z
Ladislav Záborský (1921-2016)

Slovak painters
Slovak
Painters